Clivina syriaca is a species of ground beetle in the subfamily Scaritinae. It was described by J.Sahlberg in 1908.

References

syriaca
Beetles described in 1908